North Andaman Island is the northern island of Great Andaman of the Andaman Islands. 
It belongs to the North and Middle Andaman administrative district, part of the Indian union territory of Andaman and Nicobar Islands.

Geography

The island belongs to the Great Andaman group and lies north of Middle Andaman Island. many small island groups surround its beaches. The island's main town is Diglipur.

The island previously had an indigenous population of the Great Andamanese, for example, the Bo, but they are no longer present: the island is populated by immigrants from the Indian mainland and their descendants.

The island is home to the highest point in the archipelago, Saddle Peak at 731 metres.

North Andaman has fairly frequent large earthquakes, and suffered inundation from the 2004 Indian Ocean earthquake tsunami.

Administration
The entire island is part of Diglipur Taluk.

Transportation

Economy
North Andaman is known for its marine life: the island's main industries are rice- and orange-growing.

References 

 Geological Survey of India

 
Islands of North and Middle Andaman district